The 2017 Bucher Reisen Tennis Grand Prix was a professional tennis tournament played on clay courts. It was the fifth edition of the tournament which was part of the 2017 ATP Challenger Tour. It took place in Meerbusch, Germany, between 14 and 20 August 2017.

Singles main draw entrants

Seeds

 1 Rankings as of 7 August 2017.

Other entrants
The following players received wildcards into the singles main draw:
  Matthias Bachinger
  Andreas Haider-Maurer
  Nicola Kuhn
  Henri Squire

The following players received entry from the qualifying draw:
  Kimmer Coppejans
  Markus Eriksson
  André Ghem
  Marc Sieber

Champions

Singles 

  Ricardo Ojeda Lara def.  Andreas Haider-Maurer 6–4, 6–3.

Doubles 

  Kevin Krawietz /  Andreas Mies def.  Dustin Brown /  Antonio Šančić 6–1, 7–6(7–5).

References

Bucher Reisen Tennis Grand Prix
2017
Bucher Reisen Tennis Grand Prix